Along the Way is a solo studio album by Mark McGuire, a former member of Emeralds. It was released on Dead Oceans on February 4, 2014. "The Instinct" was released as a single from the album.

Critical reception

At Metacritic, which assigns a weighted average score out of 100 to reviews from mainstream critics, the album received an average score of 75, based on 14 reviews, indicating "generally favorable reviews".

Fred Thomas of AllMusic gave the album 4 stars out of 5, commenting that "Along the Way represents the most ambitious material from McGuire to date, including deeper production and a plethora of various instruments that never made it into the laser-focused explorations of solo guitar that made up previous albums." He added: "It's an incredible feat for an artist to make something so enormous and unfolding without losing himself in the process, but McGuire has done just that, and as a result has turned in his most detailed and soul-searching work." Tom Fenwick of Under the Radar gave the album 7 stars out of 10, writing: "Carving out layers of sound from digital percussion, distant auto-tuned vocals, and washes of synthesized atmospherics, he surrounds them with his virtuosic playing of electric and acoustic guitar."

Track listing

Personnel
Credits adapted from liner notes.

 Mark McGuire – vocals, electric guitar, acoustic guitar, bass guitar, mandolin, santur, piano, keyboards, synthesizer, talkbox, percussion, drum machine, tape samples, electronics, effects, production, arrangement, mixing, photography, design, layout
 James Plotkin – mastering
 Daniel Murphy – design, layout

References

External links
 

2014 albums
Dead Oceans albums
Indie rock albums by American artists